The flag of the Region of Murcia was defined in Article 4.1 of the Statute of Autonomy of the Region of Murcia, which established the following:

The four castles evoke the region's history as a frontier zone caught between the Crown of Aragon and the Kingdom of Castile, and the Nasrid Emirate of Granada and the Mediterranean Sea: four territories of land and sea, Christians and Muslims, adventurers and warriors, all of which created a distinct Murcian culture.  The four castles also can refer to the four lordships that initially carved up the area after it was conquered by Alfonso X of Castile.
 
The seven crowns were granted to the Kingdom of Murcia by the Castilian Crown.  The first five crowns were granted by Alfonso X on May 14, 1281, when he granted the standard and municipal seal to the capital city of Murcia.  The sixth crown was granted by Peter of Castile on 4 May 1361, in honour of the loyalty of Murcia shown to Peter's cause during the War of the Two Peters.

The seventh crown was granted by Philip V of Spain on 16 September 1709 in honour of the loyalty of Murcia shown to Philip's cause during the War of the Spanish Succession.

Former Flags

See also
Coat of arms of the Region of Murcia
Flags of the autonomous communities of Spain

References

External links
 La bandera y el escudo de la Región de Murcia
 Bandera y escudo de Murcia
 Las 7 coronas y los 4 castillos, en la bandera de la Región de Murcia
 Bandera de la Comunidad

External links

Flags of Spain